Eivind Helgesen (born 10 October 2001) is a Norwegian footballer who plays as a midfielder for 1. divisjon side Sogndal.

Career statistics

Club

Notes

References

2001 births
Living people
Norwegian footballers
Norway youth international footballers
Association football midfielders
Sogndal Fotball players
Eliteserien players
People from Sogndal
Sportspeople from Vestland